Eddy Helfara Aru Kaspard (born 27 May 2001) is a Tahitian association footballer who currently plays for Pouzauges Bocage FC of the Championnat National 3, and the Tahiti national team.

Club career
As a youth Kaspard began playing with A.S. Manu-Ura from age five to ten. He then moved to A.S. Tefana where he remained until 2015. That year he participated in a trials in Metropolitan France organized by Tefana. After being spotted by Ligue 1 club AS Saint-Étienne in a tournament, he was invited to return when he turned sixteen. However, the return trial was unsuccessful and he then had a test period with AJ Auxerre. After not being offered a spot in the club, he had a successful trial with Trélissac FC of the Championnat National 2 in 2017. That year he reportedly also drew interest from AS Monaco.  In the 2021–22 Coupe de France Kaspard appeared for Trélissac in the club's Seventh Round victory over A.S. Vénus, Tahiti's representative in the tournament that season.

In December 2022, Kaspard moved to Pouzauges Bocage FC f the Championnat National 3.

International career
As a youth Kaspard represented Tahiti at the under-17 and under-20 levels. He captained the Tahiti team at the 2017 OFC U-17 Championship and scored against Papua New Guinea in the final match of the Group Stage. After turning down an offer to play for France at the under-19 level, Kaspard scored three goals in the 2018 OFC U-19 Championship. He scored against New Zealand and Papua New Guinea in the Group Stage before adding a goal against the Solomon Islands in the Semi-finals. Kaspard's three goals put him tied for third place in the tournament's Golden Boot race. Tahiti ultimately finished as runners-up in the tournament and qualified for the 2019 FIFA U-20 World Cup in Poland. Kaspard was then named to Tahiti's final roster for the tournament and appeared in all three of the nation's Group Stage matches. Ahead of the tournament he was identified as Tahit's Player to Watch by Goal.

In February 2022 Kaspard was named to Tahiti's roster for a training camp in France and 2022 FIFA World Cup qualification. He was one of four foreign-based players in the squad.

International statistics

Personal life
Kaspard's father, Abet Kaspard Tahi, is a former footballer from Pentecost Island, Vanuatu and a former member of the New Hebrides national team. His mother is from Tahiti where the younger Kaspard was born and raised.

References

External links
 
 
 
 Oceania Football Center profile

2001 births
Living people
Association football forwards
French Polynesian footballers
Tahiti international footballers